The W.C. Beattie House is a historic house located at 289 West Brittania Street in Taunton, Massachusetts.

Description and history 
The house was built in 1882 for W.C. Beattie, a designer at Reed & Barton. It is among the best extant examples of a large-scale builder-produced Queen Anne residence in the city. The -story building has a hipped-roof projecting, gable sections, and porch with a decorated gabled portico.

The house was added to the National Register of Historic Places on July 5, 1984.

See also
National Register of Historic Places listings in Taunton, Massachusetts

References

National Register of Historic Places in Taunton, Massachusetts
Houses in Taunton, Massachusetts
Houses on the National Register of Historic Places in Bristol County, Massachusetts
Houses completed in 1882
Queen Anne architecture in Massachusetts